Keith Wickham is a British voice actor, comedian and screenwriter. He is known for providing the voices of various characters in the English/French children's television series 64 Zoo Lane.

Career
Wickham voiced Changed Daily in The Secret Show, Mr. Small, and Mr. Tall in The Mr. Men Show (UK version), Corneil in Watch My Chops, Mr. Mouseling and most of the male voices in Angelina Ballerina, Nelson the Elephant, Reginald the Lion, Victor the Crocodile and the others in 64 Zoo Lane, Frank the Koala, Archie the Crocodile and Sammy the Shopkeeper in The Koala Brothers and Ol' Graham the Galleon, H.P. the Speedboat, Ken Toyn the Shipwright and Bryan the Ferry in Toot the Tiny Tugboat.

He voiced Polluto in Tommy Zoom, the first in-house BBC animation production, The Professor, Pipsquawk, Trevor and Mr. Crumble in Frankenstein's Cat and in 2009, participated on voice in Disney Channel's Jungle Junction, for then Playhouse Disney and Spider Eye Productions.

Other cartoons include: Vampires, Pirates & Aliens, Tails and The Thousand Tasks, The Way Things Work, and The Octonauts in which he plays both Professor Inkling and biologist Shellington. He has appeared in about 20 CD-ROM games including Fable and Fable II, and voiced TV commercials. He appeared on stage as Kenneth Williams in Round the Horne Revisited.

He is also recognised for voicing Steff and Sariac from Pitt and Kantrop.

Other work
Wickham worked as an actor and writer on the radio series Bits from Last Week's Radio recorded by Ear Drum productions for BBC Radio 1, as well as voicing Jack of Blades in the 2004 video game Fable.

He can also be heard in the podcast The Offcuts Drawer as part of the cast.

In addition, he has done acting work for the company iHASCO, and demonstrates through some of their interactive training, on issues such as asbestos awareness Bullying & Harassment training, Equality & Diversity, Health & Safety in the workplace, Food Allergy Awareness  amongst others.

Thomas & Friends – CGI version
Since 2009, Wickham has co-worked on the CGI version of the children's television series Thomas & Friends. Wickham co-provides the voices of various characters of the series: Edward, Henry, Gordon, James, Percy, Whiff, Dash and Harold in the UK, and Harvey, Glynn, Skarloey, Sir Handel, Bert, Stafford, Salty, Den, Norman, Bertie, Captain, Sir Topham Hatt, Dowager Hatt in both the UK/US, and various other characters.

In 2020, Wickham reprised his roles as Gordon and Sir Topham Hatt in Rainbow Sun Productions' 20th anniversary celebration reading of Thomas and the Magic Railroad.

Radio restoration
Wickham has been involved in restoration of archive BBC Radio comedy shows. He traced missing episodes of the series I'm Sorry, I'll Read That Again, which were repeated on BBC Radio 7, and restored episodes for broadcast.

Voice roles

Film

Television

Video games

References

External links
 Official website
 
 http://www.cbeebies.com

Living people
20th-century English comedians
20th-century English male actors
21st-century English comedians
21st-century English male actors
Audiobook narrators
English male comedians
English male film actors
English male television actors
English male voice actors
Male actors from Hertfordshire
People from St Albans
Year of birth missing (living people)